Rao is a title and a surname native to India. It is used mostly in states of Gujarat, Haryana, Rajasthan, Andhra Pradesh, Telangana, Karnataka and Maharashtra.

As a surname 
Notable people with this surname or title include the following:

Pre-independence 

 Rao Tula Ram (c. 1825 – 1863) - Rewari King whofought Great Battle of 1857.
 T. Madhava Rao (1829–1891) - Diwan of Travancore from 1857 to 1872.
 R. Raghunatha Rao  (c. February 1831 – May 3, 1912) - Diwan of Indore from 1875 to 1888
 R. Venkata Rao  - Diwan of Travancore from 1821 to 1829.
 T. Subba Rao - Diwan of Travancore from 1830 to 1837.
 V. P. Madhava Rao - 17th Diwan of the Mysore kingdom
 T. Ananda Rao - 18th Diwan of the Mysore kingdom
 N. Madhava Rao - 23rd Diwan of the Mysore Kingdom
 K. Krishnaswamy Rao - Diwan of Travancore from 1898 to 1904
 T. Rama Rao (administrator) -  Diwan of Travancore from 1887 to 1892
 T. Ramachandra Rao (1825-1879) - Indian civil servant and first native Indian to serve as Deputy Commissioner of Police of Madras.
 R. Ramachandra Rao (1871 – 1936) - Indian civil servant and mathematician.
 R. Balaji Rao (1842–1896) - an Indian politician, independence activist.
 Gangadharrao Deshpande (1871-1960) (also known as Lion of Karnataka) - Indian activist and leader of Indian independence movement against British rule from Belgaum.
 C. Hayavadana Rao (1865 – 1946) - an Indian historian, museologist, anthropologist, economist and polyglot. 
 T. Gopala Rao (1832 – 1886) - educationist, served as the Principal of Government Arts College, Kumbakonam after William Archer Porter and first inspector of schools under British government.

Post-independence 
 Raja Rao writer of English-language novels and short stories, whose works are deeply rooted in metaphysics
 Ayyagari Sambasiva Rao (1914–2003), an Indian scientist, founder of the Electronics Corporation of India Limited 
 Adinarayana Rao, Telugu film director and founder of Anjali pictures.
 Akkineni Nageswara Rao, Telugu film actor and founder of Annapurna studios. He received Padma Bhushan for his contribution to film industry.
 Calyampudi Radhakrishna Rao (1920-), Indian-born American mathematician and statistician
 Chennamaneni Hanumantha Rao, Indian economist and writer 
 C. S. Rao (writer), Indian writer, actor, director and producer
 C. S. Rao (1924–2004), an Indian actor, writer and director
 Dabeeru C. Rao, Indian-American statistical geneticist
 Dasari Narayana Rao, Telugu film director and actor.
 Dileep Rao (1973–), American actor
 Ganta Srinivasa Rao, Indian politician, ex-Lok Sabha member
 Gundu Hanumantha Rao, Indian actor 
 Gnaneshwara Rao, Indian cricketer
 Joginder Singh Rao, Indian cricketer
 Karri Narayana Rao, Indian lawyer, ex-member of Lok Sabha and Indian politician
 Kemburi Ramamohan Rao, Indian Politician, ex-member of Lok Sabha
 Kimidi Kalavenkata Rao, Indian Politician, ex-minister, ex-member of Rajya Sabha
 K. Keshava Rao,member of Rajya Sabha
 K. R. Rao, professor of electrical engineering at the University of Texas and co-inventor of the discrete cosine transform
 K. S. Rama Rao, Telugu cinema producer
 Kodela Siva Prasad Rao, speaker of Andhra Pradesh Assembly
 Kalvakuntla Chandrashekar Rao, Chief minister of Telangana
 Michael Rao (1967–), president of Virginia Commonwealth University since 2009
 Muttamsetti Srinivasa Rao, Indian Politician, Ex-member of Lok Sabha and minister in Andhra Pradesh Cabinet
 N. T. Rama Rao (1923 – 1996), film personality and former chief minister of united Andhra Pradesh
 Narla Tata Rao, Engineer and recipient of Padma Shri award
 Neomi Rao, American attorney and government official
 Nirmala Rao, British academic, present VC of Asian University for Women.
 Pappala Chalapathi Rao, Indian Politician
 P. V. Narasimha Rao - 9th Prime Minister Of India
 Rajkummar Rao, Indian film actor.
Amrita Rao, Indian film actress
 Panje Mangesh Rao (1874 – 1937) Indian writer and poet
Aditi Rao Hydari, Indian film actress 
Preetika Rao, Indian television actress 
 Ramoji Rao, Telugu businessman, owner of Ramoji group
 Samarla Venkata Ranga Rao (1918 – 1974), Telugu film actor and recipient of Rashtrapati Award and International Award. 
 Thummala Nageswara Rao, Telangana minister
Udupi Ramachandra Rao - Indian space scientist and director of ISRO
 V. Hanumantha Rao, Ex-member of Rajya Sabha, Indian politician
 Vandana Rao, Arjuna Awardee who represented India in 1984 and 1988 Olympics in 4 × 400 m women relay race
 Vangaveeti Mohana Ranga Rao (known as Ranga; 1947 – 1988) was an Indian National Congress politician
 Vanama Venkateshwara Rao, Ex-minister in Andhra Pradesh
 Swami Ramdas (born Vittal Rao), a saint from Kanhangad, Kerala
 Gitanjali Rao (scientist) – high achiever in science at STEM School Highlands Ranch, Colorado, US

See also
 Rao (Chinese surname)
 Rao (title)

References

Surnames of Indian origin